Hebius bitaeniatus, commonly known as the two-striped keelback or Kutkai keelback, is a species of snake of the family Colubridae. It is found in Southeast and East Asia. Its reproduction is oviparous in nature

Geographic range and habitat
Hebius bitaeniatum occurs in southern China (Yunnan, Hunan, Guizhou), Myanmar, Thailand, and Vietnam.

References 

bitaeniatus
Snakes of China
Reptiles of Myanmar
Reptiles of Thailand
Snakes of Vietnam
Reptiles described in 1925
Taxa named by Frank Wall
Taxobox binomials not recognized by IUCN